Chestnut Hill, Virginia may refer to:
Chestnut Hill, King George County, Virginia
Chestnut Hill (Leesburg, Virginia)
Chestnut Hill, Richmond County, Virginia